Kevin Wade Haller (born December 5, 1970) is a Canadian former professional ice hockey defenceman who played 13 seasons in the National Hockey League (NHL) with seven teams between 1990 and 2002. He won the Stanley Cup in 1993 while with the Montreal Canadiens. Internationally Haller played for the Canadian national junior team, winning a gold medal at the 1990 World Junior Championships.

Playing career
Haller played junior for the Regina Pats of the Western Hockey League. He was drafted by the Buffalo Sabres in the first round (14th overall) of the 1989 NHL Entry Draft from the Regina Pats. Throughout his career he played for Buffalo, the Montreal Canadiens, Philadelphia Flyers, Hartford Whalers/Carolina Hurricanes, Mighty Ducks of Anaheim and New York Islanders. Haller won the Stanley Cup with the Canadiens in 1993, however, injuries forced his early retirement in 2002 at the age of 32.

International play
Haller was a member of the Canadian national junior team at the 1990 World Junior Championships, where Canada won gold. He had four points in seven games.

Personal life
Haller is a practicing Christian, and resides in Calgary with his wife and four daughters, where he works as a real estate agent.

Career statistics

Regular season and playoffs

International

Awards
 WHL East First All-Star Team – 1990

References

External links
 

1970 births
Living people
Buffalo Sabres draft picks
Buffalo Sabres players
Canadian expatriate ice hockey players in the United States
Canadian ice hockey defencemen
Carolina Hurricanes players
Hartford Whalers players
Ice hockey people from Alberta
Mighty Ducks of Anaheim players
Montreal Canadiens players
National Hockey League first-round draft picks
New York Islanders players
Olds Grizzlys players
People from Kneehill County
Philadelphia Flyers players
Regina Pats players
Rochester Americans players
Stanley Cup champions